The Senior men's race at the 1987 IAAF World Cross Country Championships was held in Warszawa, Poland, at the Służewiec Racecourse on March 22, 1987.   A report on the event was given in the Glasgow Herald and in the Evening Times.

Complete results, medallists, 
 and the results of British athletes were published.

Race results

Senior men's race (11.95 km)

Individual

Teams

Note: Athletes in parentheses did not score for the team result

Participation
An unofficial count yields the participation of 278 athletes from 38 countries in the Senior men's race.  This is in agreement with the official numbers as published.

 (8)
 (7)
 (8)
 (7)
 (9)
 (7)
 (8)
 (4)
 (3)
 (3)
 (9)
 (9)
 (9)
 (8)
 (8)
 (7)
 (9)
 (1)
 (9)
 (7)
 (8)
 (9)
 (7)
 (8)
 (9)
 (6)
 (9)
 (9)
 (9)
 (9)
 (9)
 (7)
 (9)
 (1)
 (8)
 (8)
 (7)
 (6)

See also
 1987 IAAF World Cross Country Championships – Junior men's race
 1987 IAAF World Cross Country Championships – Senior women's race

References

IAAF World Cross Country Championships
Senior men's race at the World Athletics Cross Country Championships